Jordan Franks (born February 1, 1996) is an American football tight end who is a free agent. He played college football at UCF.

College career
Franks played four seasons for the Knights, appearing in 27 games. While initially recruited as a wide receiver, Franks played several positions at UCF, including linebacker and safety, before moving to tight end.

Professional career

Cincinnati Bengals
Franks signed with the Cincinnati Bengals as an undrafted free agent on April 28, 2018. Franks failed to make the Bengals' 53-man roster out of training camp and was subsequently signed to the team's practice squad. Franks was promoted to the active roster on October 23, 2018 after tight end Mason Schreck was placed on injured reserve with a knee injury. Franks made his NFL debut on October 28, 2018 against the Tampa Bay Buccaneers and recorded his first career reception after catching a 32-yard pass from Andy Dalton. In his rookie season Franks played in six games with two receptions for 37 yards and one tackle on special teams.

Franks was waived during final roster cuts on August 31, 2019 but was signed to the practice squad the following day. He was promoted to the active roster on December 27, 2019.

On September 5, 2020, Franks was waived by the Bengals.

Philadelphia Eagles
On September 15, 2020, Franks was signed to the Philadelphia Eagles practice squad. He was released on September 29, 2020.

Cleveland Browns
Franks was signed to the Cleveland Browns' practice squad on October 13, 2020. He was placed on the practice squad/injured list on November 4, 2020.

Franks was signed to a reserve/futures contract by the Browns on January 18, 2021. Franks was waived by the Browns on August 31, 2021. Franks was re-signed to the Browns' practice squad on September 1, 2021. He was elevated to the Browns' active roster on September 25, 2021, prior to the Browns' week 3 matchup against the Chicago Bears, and reverted to the practice squad on September 27, 2021. Franks was released by the Browns on September 28, 2021.

Kansas City Chiefs
On January 11, 2022, Franks signed a reserve/future contract with the Kansas City Chiefs. He was waived on August 30, 2022 and signed to the practice squad the next day. He was placed on the practice squad/injured list on November 23, 2022. Franks won his first Super Bowl ring when the Chiefs defeated the Philadelphia Eagles in Super Bowl LVII.

Personal life
Franks' younger brother, Feleipe, is a former quarterback for the University of Florida and University of Arkansas Razorbacks. Feleipe is currently a quarterback and tight end for the Atlanta Falcons.

References

External links
Cincinnati Bengals bio

1996 births
Living people
People from Crawfordville, Florida
Wakulla High School alumni
Players of American football from Florida
American football tight ends
UCF Knights football players
Cincinnati Bengals players
Philadelphia Eagles players
Cleveland Browns players
Kansas City Chiefs players